RFDS: Royal Flying Doctor Service is an Australian drama television series which centres around the lives of workers for the Royal Flying Doctor Service. Commissioned by the Seven Network and produced by Endemol Shine Australia, it began airing on 11 August 2021. The series was renewed for a second season in June 2022 to commence screening in 2023.

Production

Production on RFDS commenced in 2020. The series is written by Ian Meadows and produced by Imogen Banks for Endemol Shine, executive produced by Mark and Carl Fennessy for Endemol Shine Australia and Julie McGauran for Seven.

The series was due to begin production in Broken Hill in March 2020. However, due to the COVID-19 pandemic the series was temporarily suspended. Production resumed in August 2020 along with announcement of more cast members including Emma Hamilton, Ash Ricardo, Kate Mulvany, Rodney Afif, Jack Scott and Sofia Nolan, with newcomers Thomas Weatherall and Ash Hodgkinson. The first promotional trailer for the series was released in July 2021.

In June 2022, David Knox of TV Tonight reported the series had been renewed for a second season, which will be broadcast in 2023.

Cast

 Justine Clarke as Leonie Smith
 Rob Collins as Dr. Wayne Yates
 Stephen Peacocke as Nurse Pete Emerson
 Emma Hamilton as Dr. Eliza Harrod
 Ash Ricardo as Mira Ortez
 Rodney Afif as Graham Rodney
 Jack Scott as Nurse Matty Harris
 Thomas Weatherall as Darren Yates
 Sofia Nolan as Taylor Emerson
 Ash Hodgkinson as Henry Harrod
 Kate Mulvany as Rhiannon Emerson

Episodes

Season 1 (2021)

Ratings

References

External links
 

Seven Network original programming
Australian drama television series
2021 Australian television series debuts
Television series by Endemol Australia